The yellow trap is a potentially dangerous scenario relating to turns at a traffic light-controlled intersection across oncoming traffic without a protective turn signal; for right-hand traffic, this refers to a vehicle attempting to make a left turn without a permissive/protective left-turn signal.

The yellow trap occurs when the timing of the yellow lights is asymmetric for two-way traffic on a single road: when a vehicle is waiting to turn across oncoming traffic and receives a yellow light from the traffic signal, the driver may assume that oncoming traffic also has received a yellow light and proceeds with the turn, believing that oncoming traffic will yield the right-of-way on an assumed yellow. If oncoming traffic has an extended green light instead, this could lead to a crash.

Sequence

When a vehicle traveling on a road with two-way traffic is preparing to turn at an intersection and the intersection does not have a protected turn across oncoming traffic, the yellow trap may occur when the vehicle preparing to turn is given a yellow light, while at the same time, traffic on the same road moving in the opposite direction still has a green light. The driver who is intending to turn, facing the yellow (then red) light, could assume that the traffic going in the opposite direction on the same road also has a yellow or red light, and that oncoming traffic will stop or yield the right-of-way. This could potentially lead to a crash if the turning driver attempts to proceed with the turn across traffic, assuming mistakenly they can take the right-of-way, but it is not safe to do so. The turning driver may legally be at fault, for failure to yield, but the understandable mistake stems from the reasonable assumption that both lights were turning yellow simultaneously.

The Manual on Uniform Traffic Control Devices (MUTCD) allows this asymmetric light timing only if the intersection has signs posted stating that Oncoming Traffic Has Extended Green or Oncoming Traffic May Have Extended Green. However, many agencies in North America routinely allow the yellow trap, especially during emergency vehicle preemption, despite clear prohibition from the MUTCD.  Some of this stems from difficulties programming older traffic signal control software to prevent the yellow trap, but much stems from traffic engineers or technicians not understanding the yellow trap hazard, or believing it is not a serious problem.

In left-hand traffic, the same scenario is applicable for drivers turning right.

Solutions

Solutions to the yellow trap include the flashing yellow arrow, Dallas phasing, Arlington phasing, simultaneously ending both through movements (circular green lights change to yellow, then red) before serving both left-turn movements (green arrows), or prohibiting one of the two left-turn movements.

References

External links

 Fixing the Yellow Trap, Kittelson & Associates.
 Interim Approval for Optional Use of Flashing Yellow Arrow for Permissive Left Turns (IA-10) from the Manual on Uniform Traffic Control Devices.
Yellow Trap Index Page, midimagic.sgc-hosting.com

Traffic signals